Thomas Michael Dean (born August 24, 1963) is an American musician who is the bassist for heavy metal band Corrosion of Conformity.  

Dean sang on the band's early recordings from their crossover thrash era before leaving the band in 1987. In 1989, Dean, along with C.O.C. guitarist Woody Weatherman and Brian Walsby on drums, released the Snake Nation album via Caroline Records. Dean rejoined C.O.C. as the bassist and occasional vocalist in 1993 and has remained with the band since. From 2010 through 2020, the original lineup of Corrosion of Conformity consisting of Dean, Reed Mullin, and Woody Weatherman, were again performing and recording as a three-piece, until Mullin’s death in 2020.  

Along with several production and engineering credits, Dean also collaborated with Dave Grohl on the Probot song "Access Babylon", a return to the punk/metal fusion of old. He was also the producer and engineer for Vampire Circus, an album by Maryland-based doom metal band Earthride released in 2005 by Southern Lord Records. He served as touring bassist for Vista Chino in 2013 and played bass on the song "As You Wish", on Vista Chino's 2013 album Peace.

Dean currently plays bass for Lightning Born, a four-piece out of Raleigh, North Carolina formed in 2016.

Discography

Albums

EPs

Compilations
 No Core (1982, split)
 Why Are We Here? (1983, split)
 Cleanse the Bacteria (1985, compilation)
 Complete Death (1985, compilation) (Metal Blade Records)

Music videos
 "Albatross" (1994)
 "Clean My Wounds" (1994)
 "Wiseblood" (1996)
 "Drowning in a Daydream" (1996)
 "Live Volume" (DVD) (2001)
 "Stonebreaker" (2005)
 "Psychic Vampire" (2012)
 "The Moneychangers" (2012)
 "Feed On" (2013)

References

External links
Corrosion of Conformity Official Website
Gallery of Mike Dean with Corrosion of Conformity on Alberta Stars

1963 births
Living people
American heavy metal bass guitarists
American male bass guitarists
Musicians from Raleigh, North Carolina
Guitarists from North Carolina
20th-century American bass guitarists
Corrosion of Conformity members
20th-century American male musicians